An experimental use permit is a permit under the Federal Insecticide, Fungicide, and Rodenticide Act (7 U.S.C. 136c) that authorizes the testing of new pesticides or uses thereof in experimental field studies on  or more of land or  or more of water. Such tests provide data to support registration of pesticides.

References

United States Department of Agriculture